The Majorca Shepherd Dog is a domesticated breed of dog, used in the Balearic Islands of Spain, both for guarding and herding sheep and as a general purpose farm dog. It is a medium-sized dog with black fur or black with white markings on its chest.  It comes in both shorthaired and longhaired varieties.

History
While the timing of its arrival is unknown, the breed came with the conquest of King James I of Aragon or shortly thereafter, and over the centuries the Majorcan Shepherds and foravilers conferred its very own and distinct features, not only from other island dogs, but also its neighbors around the Mediterranean. It was used as a shepherd dog for cattle, a bird dog, and to guard and defend the home. It has benefited, in the islands, from the near disappearance of the Ca de Bou breed.

Selection and controlled breeding began in the 1970s, and the breed standard was drafted in 1980. This prototype was accepted by the RSCPFRCE (Royal Central Society for the Promotion of Dog Breeds of Spain) and also recognized by the top world body, the Fédération Cynologique Internationale (FCI),  on 13 September 1982.

Description
The Majorca Shepherd Dog is a tall, up to 73 cm and up to 40 kg (88 lb) shepherd and guard dog.  Most of the breed is short-haired, about 1.5 to 3 cm long on the back, with a very fine, thin undercoat. In the long haired variety, the hair is slightly wavy on the back and can reach over 7 cm in length in the winter. In the long-haired variety the undercoat is well distributed and not thick, showing varying shades of black.  The ears, which are slightly bent from the side, are relatively small, triangular, thick and set high on the head.  The color of the fur is described by the Fédération Cynologique Internationale as follows: "The only acceptable color is black in the shades jet, normal and pitch black.  White is only permitted on the chest, a thin tie at the neck and the front and rear (...) ". Räber mentions an additional dark brindle coloration.

The Majorca Shepherd Dog's life expectancy is about 12 to 13 years and they require high amount of exercise : a minimum of an hour a day, not including free time to run in the yard. Many enjoy swimming, jogging and hiking in addition to long walks around the neighborhood.

The Majorca Shepherd Dog was never bred for beauty and has a rough appearance. Temperamentally they are protective, potentially aggressive, and courageous.  Majorcas are often better in only-dog households without small children. While the breed is intensely loyal, he's a little too defensive and intense to live with very young kids, and much too territorial and dog-aggressive to live with other dogs. Although it is unusual for a black dog to tolerate heat well, the Majorca Shepherd Dog can tolerate the high temperatures of the Mediterranean climate, and they have been exported to Brazil where they have been successfully used to protect private property.

Food and Diet 
As an energetic and active breed, the Majorca Shepherd Dog needs a high-quality dry food containing about 20% protein and 7% fat.

See also
 Dogs portal
 List of dog breeds

Notes

External links
 "The Story of the Modern Ca de Bestiar"

FCI breeds
Livestock guardian dogs
Majorca Shepherd Dog